The Concurso Literario de La Felguera (La Felguera Literary Competition) or Premio Internacional de Relatos Cortos de La Felguera (La Felguera Short Stories International Award) is the most important tales competition of Spain and one of the most popular in Spanish language.

It was created in 1950 like a poems competition, until 1955, and since that year as a tales or short stories competition. It takes place in the town of La Felguera (Principality of Asturias, Spain). The award consists in the Llaves de San Pedro (Saint Peter Keys) and 8.000 €.
Every year the San Pedro Cultural Society receives hundreds of stories from all around the world.

{|  style="background:#ffffff" align="top" class="sortable wikitable"
|+ align="center" style="background:DarkSlateBlue; color:white" |Awarded Stories
! Year
! Title
! Author
|-
| 1956
| Los Jueves, cita con los fantasmas
| Felipe Santullano
|-
| 1957
| Sólo casó de blanco a la pequeña
| Ramón Zulaica
|-
| 1958
| Las tres hermanas
| Luciano Castañón
|-
| 1959
| El trato
| Mauro Muñiz
|-
| 1960
| El hombre del café
| Eduardo G. Rico
|-
| 1961
| El vaso de agua
| José Antonio Mases
|-
| 1962
| La vagoneta
| Mauro Muñiz 
|-
| 1963
| El buen amanecer
| José Luis Prado Nogueira
|-
| 1964
| Acero
| Venancio Ovies
|-
| 1965
| Un pedazo de vidrio de color verde
| Carlos Murciano
|-
| 1966
| La alcoba, simplemente
| José A. del Cañizo Perate
|-
| 1967
| El surco en la sonrisa
| Fernando López Serrano
|-
| 1968
| Quisicosas de Don General
| José Modellel Soriano
|-
| 1969
| La tonta
| Justo Merino Belmonte
|-
| 1970
| González, retrato de un hombre
| Pilar Nervión
|-
| 1971
| Detrás de un alihustre o un envónimo
| Ángel Palomino
|-
| 1972
| Penúltimo invierno
| Rodrigo Rubio
|-
| 1973
| La corta
| Manuel Lozano Garrido
|-
| 1974
| Sombre este cadáver de ceniza
| Luis Fernández Roces
|-
| 1975
| El último traje del Coronel
| Anastasio Fernández Sanjosé
|-
| 1976
| Descenso a las quimeras
| Juan Gómez Saavedra
|-
| 1977
| Materia de confesión
| Alfonso Simón Pelegrí
|-
| 1978
| Aturuxo, el vikingo
| Ramón Eiroa
|-
| 1979
| Guárdame los sellos
| Pedro Quintanilla Buev
|-
| 1980
| Pequeña meditación
| Elena Santiago
|-
| 1981
| Incidente en Atocha
| José Ferrer Bermejo
|-
| 1982
| ''Los encendios pámpanos
| Carlos Sánchez Pinto
|-
| 1983
| ElValet de hojalata
| Maximiliano Mariotti
|-
| 1984
| El hombre y el toro
| Enrique Sánchez y Pascual
|-
| 1985
| Vuelo oculto
| Salvador García Jiménez
|-
| 1986
| Quiliceros queridos
| Jorge González Aranguren
|-
| 1987
| Voz sin eco
| Gonzalo Martínez Simarro
|-
| 1988
| Nido
| José Luis Carrasco
|-
| 1989
| La plaga
| Migel Lizando Martínez
|-
| 1990
| Desencuentro al otro lado del tiempo
| Luis Sepúlveda
|-
| 1991
| Seychelles
| Ramón Muñoz-Chapulí
|-
| 1992
| Madre para amar
| Inés Fernández Moreno 
|-
| 1993
| Último silencio
| Eugenio Fuentes Pulido 
|-
| 1994
| El hombre que felicitóal presidente
| José Antonio Illanes Fernández
|-
| 1995
| El hombre que perdió los números
| José María Latorre Macarrón
|-
| 1996
| Rex Angelorum
| Manuel Jurado López
|-
| 1997
| Fado impostor
| Ignacio Cinto García
|-
| 1998
| Una cuestión personal
| Pilar Navarrete Hernández
|-
| 1999
| El umbral
| Marcelo Simonetti Ugarte
|-
| 2000
| El necrófil
| Juan Cánovas Ortega
|-
| 2001
| Deutsches Requiem
| Ricardo Gómez Gil
|-
| 2002
| Reencuentro
| M. Francisco Rodríguez
|-
| 2003
| Los Habituales de la brioche
| Juan Jacinto Muñoz Rengel
|-
| 2004
| Leningrado tiene setecientos puentes
| Mar Sancho 
|-
| 2005
| La tejedora de muertos
| Rosa Gladys Ruiz de Azúa Aracama 
|-
| 2006
| Al que Vd. quiera
| José Javier Alfaro Calvo
|-
| 2007
| El escrúpulo místico
| Miguel Sánchez Robles
|-
| 2008
| La sangre del violín
| María Luisa del Romero
|-
| 2009
| El sueño del monstruo
| Juan Jacinto Muñoz Rengel
|-
| 2010
| Aleluya
| José Adolfo Muñoz Palancas
|-
| 2011
| Una moneda de cobre
| Ángel Fernández
|-
| 2012
| El infinito y mucho más
| Dolroes Marín
|-
| 2013
| Es pecado matar a un ruiseñor
| María Isabel Andreu
|-
| 2014
| Not awarded
| Not awarded
|}

{|  style="background:#ffffff" align="top" class="sortable wikitable"
|+ align="center" style="background:DarkSlateBlue; color:white" |Awarded Poems
! Year
! Title
! Author
|-
| 1950
| Exaltación al trabajo
| V. Eugenio Hernández Vista
|-
| 1951
| Espíritu y laboriousidad de La Felguera
| D. Jacinto Maestre
|-
| 1952
| Himno al trabajo
| D. Lorenzo Guardiola Tomas 
|-
| 1953
| Fervor de Asturias
| Dña. Ángeles Villarta 
|-
| 1954
| El Mensaje de las Cumbres
| D. Joaquín A. Bonet 
|-
| 1955
| Picos de Europa
| D. Luis López Anglade 
|}

References 
The information in this article is based on that in its Spanish equivalent.

External links 
San Pedro Cultural Society website 

Felguera
Felguera
Felguera
Asturian culture
1950 establishments in Spain